Mohanam is a rāga in Carnatic music (musical scale of South Indian classical music). It is an audava rāga (or owdava rāga, meaning pentatonic scale). It is usually described as a janya rāga of Harikamboji (28th Melakartha Raga). However, alternate opinions suggest that Mechakalyani may be a more appropriate classification based on the lakshana of the raga.

The equivalent of Mohanam in Hindustani music is Bhoop (or Bhopali).

It is one of the most common pentatonic scales across the world and is very popular in East Asian and Southeast Asian music, including China and Japan.

Structure and Lakshana 

Mohanam is a symmetric rāga that does not contain madhyamam and nishādham. It is a symmetric pentatonic scale (audava-audava raga in Carnatic music classification - audava meaning 'of 5'). Its  structure (ascending and descending scale) is as follows (see swaras in Carnatic music for details on below notation and terms):

 :  
 :  
(the notes used in this scale are shadjam, chathusruthi rishabham, antara gandharam, panchamam, chathusruthi dhaivatham)

Mohanam is usually classified as a janya rāga of Harikambhoji, the 28th Melakarta rāga, though alternate opinions exist that prefer classifying it as a janya raga of Kalyani based on its lakshana. The Hindustani equivalent Bhoop is associated with Kalyan thaat (the equivalent of Kalyani).

One of the first scales employed by the ancient Tamils was the Mullaippann (3 BCE), a pentatonic scale composed of the notes sa ri ga pa da equivalent to C, D, E, G, and A in the western notations. These fully harmonic scales, constitutes the raga Mohanam in the Carnatic music style.

Popular compositions
Mohanam rāga lends itself to extensive elaboration and exploration and has many classical music and film music compositions.

Kritis
The geetham Varavina mridupani is one of the first short songs taught to beginners in Carnatic music. Ninnukori composed by Poochi Srinivasa Iyengar is a popular Varnam in this scale. Here are some popular kritis composed in Mohanam.
Preenayamo Vasudevam By Madhwacharya
Cheri Yasodaku Sisuvithadu, Podagantimayya by Annamacharya
Madhva nama By Sripadaraja
Kolalanooduva Chaduranyare By Vyasatirtha
Raja Beediyolaginda, Narayanana Nene Manave, Dashavatara Stuti, Ava reethiyinda By Vadiraja Tirtha
Ranga Nayaka Raajeeva Lochana, Mella mellane bandane, Pillangoviya Cheluva, Bandalu Mahalakshmi, Bide Ninna Padava, Vaidya Banda Nodi, Yaaru Olidarenu, En Savi En Savi  by Purandaradasa
Sundari Rangana Tandu Tora By Kanaka Dasa
Intha Prabhuva, Rama Rama Emberadakshara, Linga Ennantaranga By Vijaya Dasa
Barayyya Ba ba By Gopala Dasa
Eddu Baruthare By Jagannatha Dasa
Hakkiya Hegaleri By Prasanna Venkata Dasa
Mohana rama, Nannu palimpa, Dayarani, Rama ninnu nammina, Evarura ninnuvina and Bhavanutha by Thyagaraja
Narasimha Agaccha, Kadambari Priyayaih, Gopika Manoharam by Muthuswamy Dikshitar
Kapaali karunai and Narayana divyanamam by Papanasam Sivan
Rara Rajiva lochana by Mysore Vasudevachar
En Palli Kondeer Aiyya by Arunachala Kavi
Kshemam Kuru by Narayana Teertha
Swagatam Krishna by Oottukkadu Venkata Kavi
Pari pahimam Nruhara by Swati Thirunal
Sada Palaya Sarasakshi by G N Balasubramaniam
Mohanam Tavavapurai by Swathi Thirunal
Ninnukkori Varnam by Ramanathapuram Srinivasa Iyengar
Nagalingam by Muttayya Bhagavatar

Tamil movie songs in Mohanam

Telugu Film Songs

Related rāgas

Graha bhedam 
Mohanam's notes when shifted using Graha bhedam, yields 4 other major pentatonic rāgas, namely, Hindolam, Shuddha Saveri, Udayaravichandrika (also known as Shuddha Dhanyasi) and Madhyamavati. Graha bhedam is the step taken in keeping the relative note frequencies same, while shifting the shadjam to the next note in the rāga. For more details and illustration of this concept refer Graha bhedam on Mohanam.

Scale similarities 
Mohanakalyani is a rāga which has the ascending scale of Mohanam and descending scale of Kalyani. Its  structure is S R2 G3 P D2 S : S N3 D2 P M2 G3 R2 S
Bilahari is a rāga which has the ascending scale of Mohanam and descending scale of Sankarabharanam. Its  structure is S R2 G3 P D2 S : S N3 D2 P M1 G3 R2 S
Garudadhvani is a rāga which has the ascending scale of Sankarabharanam and descending scale of Mohanam. Its  structure is S R2 G3 M1 P D2 N3 S : S D2 P G3 R2 S
Shivaranjani rāga differs from Mohanam only by the gāndhāram. It uses sadharana gāndhāram instead of antara gāndhāram and its  structure is S R2 G2 P D2 S : S D2 P G2 R2 S
Hamsadhvani rāga uses nishadam in place of dhaivatam. Its  structure is S R2 G3 P N3 S : S N3 P G3 R2 S
Vaasantha rāga differs from Mohanam only by the daivatham. It uses shudda Daivatham instead of Chatushruti Daivatham and its  structure is S R2 G3 P D1 S : S D1 P G3 R2 S
Vasantha used Shudda Rishabham and not Shudda Daivatham
Niroshta rāga uses nishadam in place of panchamam. Its  structure is S R2 G3 D2 N3 S : S N3 D2 G3 R2 S

Notes

References 

Janya ragas